Fairview Cemetery and Memorial Gardens is a 20-acre cemetery located in Wahpeton, North Dakota. Established in 1869, Fairview is the final resting place for many notable area residents.

Fairview is a non-denominational, non-profit organization governed by a nine-member volunteer board of directors. The cemetery comprises Old Fairview, which occupies the southern half of the cemetery grounds, and the Memorial Gardens, which is newer, and occupies the northern half.

External links 
 Fairview Cemetery Association
 
 
 

1869 establishments in Dakota Territory
Cemeteries in North Dakota
Buildings and structures in Richland County, North Dakota
Wahpeton, North Dakota